Soft Warehouse may refer to:

Soft Warehouse (Hawaii), a software company in the 1970s and 1980s, later acquired by Texas Instruments
Soft Warehouse (Texas), a company in the 1980s that later became CompUSA